Vasilios Kinalis (born 22 April 1999) is a Greek professional footballer who plays as a goalkeeper for Super League 2 club Apollon Smyrnis.

References

1999 births
Living people
Greek footballers
Greek expatriate footballers
Greece youth international footballers
Super League Greece players
Serie D players
Football League (Greece) players
Atromitos F.C. players
S.E.F. Torres 1903 players
Association football goalkeepers
Footballers from Serres